The Rugby Football League (RFL) is the governing body for rugby league in England. Founded in 1895 as the Northern Rugby Football Union following 22 clubs resigning from the Rugby Football Union, it changed its name in 1922 to the Rugby Football League. 

Based at Sportcity in Manchester, it is responsible for organising professional competitions and, in association with the British Amateur Rugby League Association (BARLA), the community game. It also provides match officials for every level as well as administering the England national team

The Rugby Football League has been a member of the International Rugby League (IRL) since 1948 and European Rugby League (ERL) since its foundation in 2003.

History

On Tuesday 27 August 1895, as a result of an emergency meeting in Manchester, prominent Lancashire rugby clubs Broughton Rangers, Leigh, Oldham, Rochdale Hornets, St Helens, Tyldesley, Warrington, Widnes and Wigan declared that they would support their Yorkshire colleagues in their proposal to form a Northern Union.

Two days later, on Thursday 29 August 1895, representatives of 21 clubs met in the George Hotel, Huddersfield to form the "Northern Rugby Football Union" (usually termed Northern Union or NU). Twenty clubs agreed to resign from the Rugby Football Union, but Dewsbury felt unable to comply with the decision. The Cheshire club, Stockport, had telegraphed the meeting requesting admission to the new organisation and was duly accepted with a second Cheshire club, Runcorn, admitted at the next meeting.

The 21 clubs  were:
 Batley, 
 Bradford FC (switched to association football in 1907 and became Bradford Park Avenue)
 Brighouse Rangers (Folded in 1906, now survives as an amateur club)
 Broughton Rangers (Folded in 1955)
 Halifax
 Huddersfield
 Hull FC
 Hunslet FC (Folded in 1973 but were resurrected as a Phoenix club)
 Leeds
 Leigh
 Liversedge (Folded in 1902, survive as an amateur club)
 Manningham (Switched to association football in 1903 and became Bradford City)
 Oldham
 Rochdale Hornets
 Runcorn (Folded in 1918)
 St Helens
 Stockport (Folded in 1902)
 Tyldesley (Disbanded in 1902) 
 Wakefield Trinity
 Warrington
 Widnes
 Wigan 

In 1908 the Northern Union's brand of rugby was taken up in Australia and New Zealand. The Union hosted touring sides from both countries before assembling a Great Britain representative team for a 1910 tour of Australia and New Zealand. These nations, particularly Australia, would go on to excel in the sport and gain significant influence over it over the following century.

The British Amateur Rugby League Association (BARLA) was created in 1973 in Huddersfield by a group of enthusiasts concerned about the dramatic disappearance of many amateur leagues and clubs. Fewer than 150 amateur teams remained with a mere 30 youth rugby league teams. The 'breakaway' from the RFL was acrimonious and was strongly contested, with a vote 29–1 against recognising BARLA. Thanks to Tom Mitchell, this changed to a unanimous vote of approval for BARLA within 12 months.

Maurice Lindsay became the Chief Executive of the RFL in 1992, proposing the Super League, which replaced Championship as the sport's premier league competition from 1996 onwards. Lindsay returned to Wigan in 1999 for his second stint at the club after Sir Rodney Walker, then chairman of the RFL, sacked him from the RFL after a campaign to unseat him failed.

The RFL accumulated losses of £1.9 million at the end of 2001, shortly before a major restructuring of the governing body and the appointment of Richard Lewis as executive chairman in May 2002. Within a year of joining the RFL, he oversaw reunification with BARLA after nearly 30 years of division.  Lewis left in 2012 to become Chief Executive of the All England Lawn Tennis and Croquet Club.  The RFL net value has been positive every year since 2004, being £1.7 million in 2011.

In 2011 a major change to the game was agreed, changing from a winter to a summer game, starting in 2012 with a playing season from March to November, aligning with the Super League, which has played this way since 1996. The regional leagues may include winter competitions in addition.

In 2012, the Rugby Football League were awarded the Stonewall Sport Award in recognition of their work in embracing inclusivity and tackling homophobia. They also became the first UK sporting organisation to make the top 100 employers in the Stonewall Index that measures attitudes towards lesbian, gay and bisexual staff.

Prince Harry, Duke of Sussex served as patron until February 2021.

Competitions

The RFL operates a five-tier system and is responsible for running the top three professional divisions as well as the National Conference League and various regional leagues below that. The RFL also runs two cup competitions for professional clubs and is involved with the organization of the World Club Challenge and World Club Series.

Teams

English national team

The England national rugby league team represent England in international rugby league football tournaments. The team has now seen a revival, having largely formed from the Great Britain team, who also represented Wales, Scotland and Ireland. The team is run under the auspices of the Rugby Football League. As of 2008, the team now participates in all World Cups, Four Nations, and Test matches.

The team dates back to 1904 when they played against a mixture of Welsh and Scottish players in Wigan. Since then, and right up until the 1950s, they regularly toured Australia and New Zealand and played both home and away matches against neighbours Wales and France. But when it was decided that Great Britain would tour the Southern Hemisphere instead of England, France and Wales became the only regular opponents. Even then though, there are some long periods where England barely played any matches. Their first appearance in the Rugby League World Cup was in 1975, and since then they have become runners-up in 1975 and 1995, the latter tournament being held in England. In 2008 they competed in the 2008 World Cup in Australia. For many years England also competed in the European Nations Cup and in 2006, an England 'A' team, competed for the Federation Shield. In the past England's main rivals have been Wales and France, with the rivalry stretching back to 1908 and 1934 respectively. However, England's main rivals would now be Australia, New Zealand and, to a lesser extent, France.

Traditionally a predominantly white kit is worn including white shorts and socks. However the shirt usually features some form of red, like red stripes, crosses or chevrons. These colours are similar to other English sporting teams and are the colours used on the national flag. In 2008 a new kit was introduced featuring a red cross on the front and red strips down the sides of the shirt, shorts and socks were white too with red strips. Also in 2008 the Rugby Football League chose to abandon the traditional English lion on the badge in favour of a much simpler shield and cross design, nevertheless the team will still be known as "The Lions".

Currently the team is ranked third in the world, behind Australia and New Zealand. Steve McNamara became head coach leaving Bradford to take the national job and Sean O'Loughlin is the current captain.

Great Britain national team

The Great Britain national rugby league team represents Great Britain in rugby league football. Administered by the Rugby Football League (RFL), the team is nicknamed the "Great Britain Lions", or simply "The Lions".

For most of the 20th century the Great Britain team was assembled to go on tours overseas, and to play against foreign touring teams, as well as competing in Rugby League World Cup tournaments. They were one of the strongest teams in rugby league, though usually playing second fiddle to Australia. They won the Rugby League World Cup on three occasions: 1954, 1960 and 1972.

Since 1995 the RFL have sent the home nations as separate teams for World Cup purposes. Great Britain continued to compete as a test playing nation both home and away. They competed against Australia for the Ashes, and New Zealand for the Baskerville Shield, as well the Tri-Nations series with both Australia and New Zealand. Great Britain also played in series and tours against other nations such as France, Papua New Guinea and Fiji.

In 2006, the RFL announced that after the 2007 All Golds Tour the Great Britain team would no longer compete on a regular basis, and that players would be able to represent England, Wales and Scotland at Test level. It is planned that the Great Britain team will come together in future only for occasional tours, similar to the British and Irish Lions in rugby union.

Board of directors
The RFL board consists of the following:

Young People's Advisory Panel

The RFL launched the Young People's Advisory Panel in 2010, a group consisting of young people aged 16–25 from across England. The national panel meet at least three times a year at the RFL's Red Hall headquarters to discuss and debate the following:

 Changes in the structure of youth rugby;
 Communications between young rugby league enthusiasts and the RFL;
 RFL policies which impact on young people.

Two nominated members will also sit on the youth & junior forum, a key device used to advance youth rugby league.

Presidents

Logo
The first logo used by the RFL was an oval shape, representing the ball with XIII and 13 over it and The Rugby Football League around it. The logo was also seen on the sleeve of teams shirts.

In the late 1990s the logo was changed to a more simplistic design to the old one. It had a rugby ball shape with three small lines, representing 13 players, and two long lines, representing goalposts, arranged on a rugby ball so as to suggest a hand carrying or passing it. The Rugby Football League was abbreviated to RFL.

In 2017 the RFL had its most radical rebrand since the formation of Super League. The new logo was a rectangular background meant to represent The George Hotel in Huddersfield, where rugby league was founded and 1895 the year it was founded. Thirteen stripes inside it represent thirteen players. The oval on top represents the ball and the appreciation RFL has been replaced with Rugby Football League.

Headquarters
The RFLs current headquarters are at Sportcity in East Manchester. The RFL first moved into permanent headquarters in 1922 at 180 Chapeltown Road, Leeds, where it stayed for 73 years before leaving in 1995 to Red Hall in Leeds, a Grade II listed brick building dating from 1642.

In 2015, some departments including Super League, moved to offices at Quay West in Trafford Wharf, Greater Manchester.

See also

 Rugby league in the British Isles
 Rugby league in England
 Rugby league in Ireland
 Rugby league in Scotland
 Rugby league in Wales
 Rugby League International Federation
 Rugby League European Federation

References

External links

The Rugby Football League's (RFL) Operational rules
engage Super League
Rugby Football League Archive, 1898–2002

 
Organisations based in Leeds
Sports organizations established in 1895
 
1895 establishments in the United Kingdom
Sport in Leeds
Sports governing bodies in the United Kingdom
Sports leagues established in 1895
Super League